The Faqir (faqīr) are a Muslim ethnic group in India. They are also known as Syed, Alwi, Shah, Sain Pir, Dewan Saheb, Miya Shah, Shah Saheb, Dewan Baba in India, Shah is now their preferred self-designation and in West Bengal they are called as Faqirbaba. Faqirs cast of Syed community is evident in the Deccan Region of Telangana State. Since the people of this community are the descendants of Sufi Saints belonging to Syeds lineage, is traced to Ali, so they are called as  Syed, Shah, Mir, Shah-Diwan and by other surnames. They are also venerated as pir or peer saheb. Some Muslims also visit the holy shrines (mazar or dargah ) of Sufi Saint or peer fakir. They are respected in Muslims like Brahmins in Hindus. Some live in the Terai region of Nepal.

History and origin 
The word fakir or faqir ( (noun of faqr)) is derived from the word faqr ("poverty") It is a Muslim Sufi ascetic in Middle East and South Asia and the Faqirs were wandering Dervishes teaching Islam and living on alms. In India, they are a community of religious mendicants  who belonged to a number of Sufi orders. Over time their descendants have formed a distinct endogamous community. In Uttar Pradesh, the Faqir have eight divisions, of which the Sain and Jogi Faqir now form distinct communities. The six remaining divisions are as follows; the Jalalia, Zinda Shahi, known as Shah Madari, Syed, Chishti,  Qalandari, Pakhiya and Rifai. Among the Faqir of Uttar Pradesh, there is an hierarchy of sorts, with the Jalali claiming precedence, on account of the fact the order started in Iran, and then arrived in India. While the Zinda Shahi  are followers of a Sufi known as Zinda Shah Madar, and the progeny of this group. The Real name is 'Syed Badiuddin Zinda Shah Madar' (Madar means pole of the Universe)  whose shrine is located in Makanpur, district Kanpur, Uttar Pradesh.  He was a great Sufi Legend and lived a life of 596 years. He was among the first Sufi's to arrive in India and is the largest Sufi following in India and Asia. The word zinda in Urdu means alive, on account of the Zinda Shahi belief that spiritual guide is still alive. The Shrine attracts thousands of pilgrims and during annual fairs both in Basant Panchmi and Islamic month of jamadil Awal the numbers rose to millions.  He was a great Sufi saints and his contemporaries were Mir Ashraf Jahangir Simnani of Kichowcha, UP, Abdul Qadir Jilani of Baghdad, Khwaja Moinuddin Chisti of Ajmer & many great Sufis of his time.

The Chishti are well known Sufi order, the Chishti Faqirs outnumber the other three Sunni groupings, and are followers of the famous Sufi saint Moinuddin Chishti. While the Qalandari are followers of Bu Ali Qalander, and the Pakhiya and Rifai are well known Sufi orders. In additions to these four groupings, the Sain now form a distinct grouping, and are no longer considered as Faqirs, while the Jogi Faqir, as a community of Muslim Rajputs also consider themselves distinct from the larger Faqir community.

In the Deccan region of Telangana, most of the Syeds belong to Faqir cast or community. The Syeds lineage is rooted to Ahl-e-Baith, assumed to be descendants of Muhammad.

The Faqirs of Gujarat consist of five divisions, the Junhasha, Madari, Rafai, Jalili and Sarbadi. They are distributed all over Gujarat, and many now live in settlements around tombs of famous Sufi saints. Some are employed as caretakers at the various shrines. The Faqir speak Gujarati, with many now understanding Urdu.

In Maharashtra the word Faqir is a general term for a class of Muslim Sufi. The Maharashtra Faqirs claim descent from Abu Bakar, the first caliph and Ali the fourth caliph of Islam. They are further divided into two groupings, the Ba-shara, who follow the rules of Islam, and Be-shara, who do not follow the shariat. Many of the Be-shara lead a nomadic existence.

Present circumstances

In haryana 
In haryana, the bulk of the shah are landowners and cultivators, with poultry being an important secondary occupation. In Rohilkhand, and in particular in Bareilly District, the community were and are large zamindars. They live throughout Uttar Pradesh, and speak Urdu, as well as local dialects of Hindi, such as Khari boli and Awadhi. Most Faqir live in multi-caste and multi-religious villages, although they occupy their own quarters. Each sub-division has its own caste council, which deals with and resolves any intra community problem.

Like other haryana Muslims, they are strictly endogamous. While the Chishti intermarry with the Rifai and Pakhiya, but not with the Qalandari. Marriages tend take place within close kin, and they prefer parallel cousin marriages.

The shah are now leading demands for the inclusion of their community within the Scheduled Caste category. As part of their political mobilisation, the community now prefer the self-designation ShahAlvi. Like other Muslim occupational castes, they have now set up a statewide caste association, to act as a communal pressure group.

In Gujarat

Thes shah practice community endogamy and marriages mostly take place within the community. Both parallel cousin and cross cousin marriages are practiced.

Their traditional occupation is teaching Islamic ways of life, while others are employed at various Sufi shrines. A majority of the community are now employed as daily wage labourers. The shah are one of the most marginalized Muslim community in Gujarat. They are Sunni Muslims, but incorporate many folk beliefs.

In Maharashtra 

The shah, like many other Muslim communities in Maharashtra speak both Urdu and Marathi. They are distributed in the districts of Amravati and Nagpur. The community consists of five endogamous sections, the Banwa, Madari (Zinda Shahi), Jalal Shahi, Saiyad Shah, Rafai, and Jalali. Marriages tend to be contracted within these groupings, with the community practising both cross cousin and parallel cousin marriages. The Madari Faqir are the descendants of Sufi saints belonging to Syeds (Saiyad) and their family tree (Shajra-E-Nasab) is meet to Ali Ibn Abi Talib (Fourth Khalifa of Islam of Sunnis and First Imam Of Shias). Some People of this community also live in Aurangabad.

Banwa Faqirs are Belogs to Banwa Sufi order, a sub-branch of Qadriya Sufi order founded by Shaykh Abdul Qadir Jilani of Baghdad, Iraq.

The traditional occupation of the shah is teaching of Islamic education by various ways and To Spread The Knowledge of Islam, although there is a gradual movement towards other occupations. Many are now involved in government jobs and private owned business. Their standard of living has improved, especially those settled in Nagpur city.

The Shahji Faqir of West Bengal 

The Faqir of West Bengal are also known as Sahaji. They are said to have acquired the name Sahaji on account of the fact that they were followers of Sher Ali Shahji, a well known Bengali Sufi saint. Most Faqir consider the famous Sufi Abdul Qadir Jillani as their mentor, and most Faqir in Bengal thus belong to the Qadriyah Sufi order. A smaller number belong to the Chishti, Madariya, Mojadidi, and Naqshbandia. orders Like in other parts of India, the Faqir have evolved from what was originally a community of Sufi mendicants into an endogamous caste grouping. They live mainly in the districts of Nadia, Howrah, Murshidabad, Malda, Bankura, Birbhum and Purulia. The majority of the West Bengal Faqir are now cultivators, living in multi-caste villages, in their own quarters known as Faqir paras. They cultivate paddy, jute, mustard and tilli seeds. A small number are also landless agricultural labourers. The Faqir speak Bengali and follow the Sunni sect of Islam. But they practice a number of folk beliefs, collectively referred to as faqirmat. This involves paying special reverence to a number of Sufi saints. A significant number of Faqir are also involved in the production of cooking oil, an activity traditionally associated with the Teli caste in other parts of India.
Fariyad Ali Alvi Rjpura Sambhal
F

Notable People
Jan-Fishan Khan, Nawab of Sardhana
Ikbal Ali Shah, Nawab of Sardhana
Arif Ali shah, British Film Writer
Naseeruddin Shah, Bollywood Actor & Director 
Zameer Uddin Shah, Former Lieutenant General of Indian Army and VC of Amu
Mohammad Ali Shah, Former Major in  Indian Army & Bollywood Actor 
Nawab Shah, Bollywood Actor
Aarif Alvi , Pakistani President 
Majnu Shah , Indian Freedom Fighter and Leader of Fakir-Sannyasi Rebellion 
Raashid Alvi , Indian Politician
 Amina Shah, British Author & Poet
Karim Shah, Indian Freedom Fighter & Founder of Mad Path Movement against Britisher.
Tahir Shah, British Journalist and Documentary Maker
Safia Shah, British Writer, Television News Producer

References 

Social groups of Gujarat
Muslim communities of India
Muslim communities of Gujarat
Social groups of Maharashtra
Muslim communities of Maharashtra
Social groups of Uttar Pradesh
Muslim communities of Uttar Pradesh
Social groups of West Bengal